The women's 100 metres hurdles event at the 2005 Summer Universiade was held on 15–16 August in Izmir, Turkey.

Medalists

Results

Heats
Wind:Heat 1: +0.6 m/s,  Heat 2: -0.1 m/s,  Heat 3: ? m/s,  Heat 4: ? m/s

Semifinals
Wind:Heat 1: -0.9 m/s,  Heat 2: -0.7 m/s

Final
Wind: +0.5 m/s

References
Finals results
Full results
Heats results

Athletics at the 2005 Summer Universiade
2005 in women's athletics
2005